Vincenzo Fimratura (died 3 March 1648) was a Roman Catholic priest who served as Prelate of Santa Lucia del Mela (1628-1648).

Biography
On 24 March 1628, Vincenzo Fimratura was appointed by Pope Urban VIII as Prelate of Santa Lucia del Mela. He served as Prelate of Santa Lucia del Mela until his death on 3 March 1648.

References

External links and additional sources
 (for Chronology of Bishops) 
 (for Chronology of Bishops) 

1648 deaths
17th-century Roman Catholic bishops in Sicily